Rupert Rheeder (born 19 November 1976 in Barberton) is a South African former road cyclist.

Major results
2005
 African Cycling Championships
1st  Road race
3rd  Time trial 
 1st Stage 3 (TTT) Tour d'Egypte
 5th Overall Tour du Sénégal
1st Points classification
1st Prologue & Stages 1 & 6 
2006
 1st Prologue & Stages 1 & 6 Tour d'Egypte
 2nd Overall UCI Africa Tour
 10th Overall Tour of Chongming Island

References

1976 births
Living people
South African male cyclists
People from Barberton, Mpumalanga